Uprising Academy is an American esports team for the video game Overwatch competing in Overwatch Contenders (OWC) and an academy team for the Boston Uprising of the Overwatch League (OWL). The franchise played its first four seasons as Toronto Esports; shortly after being purchased by the Kraft Group, the team rebranded as Uprising Academy due to a naming rights issue with Toronto Defiant. The team is based in Boston, Massachusetts and recently played in the North American region of OWC.

Franchise history

2016–2018: Toronto Esports 
Toronto Esports Club, a multi-game esports organization, announced their intention to enter the competitive Overwatch scene under the name Toronto Esports on August 6 with the hiring of Chris "HuK" Loranger as the team's Overwatch consultant manager; a month later, the club announced their first professional Overwatch roster. Toronto Esports competed in North America Contenders 2017 Season 0, but failed to qualify for 2017 Season 1.

On February 19, 2018, Uprising announced that Toronto Esports would be competing as Boston's academy team in Contenders for 2018 Season 1. In their first season as an affiliate team, Toronto made it to the North America Grand Finals, where the team fell 1–4 to Fusion University. The team again qualified for the playoffs in 2018 Season 2, where they faced Fusion University in the quarterfinals; although the match was closer than their Grand Finals match the previous season, Toronto lost 2–3.

In November 2018, Blizzard Entertainment informed Toronto Esports Club that the team must drop the word "Toronto" from its Overwatch team brand, as the new Overwatch League expansion team Toronto Defiant had "exclusive naming rights" in the city. The club responded by attempting to disband their Overwatch team altogether, posting on Twitter, 

However, Loranger clarified that the Kraft organization still owned all the rights to the players, coaches, and the Contenders slot held by the team and would continue to compete in Contenders, albeit under a new brand.

2018–present: Uprising Academy 
On November 28, 2018, the team officially announced that they would be competing under the name Uprising Academy. In 2018 Season 3, Uprising qualified for the playoffs, but fell to XL2 Academy in the quarterfinals. The team did not qualify for the playoffs the following season, posting a 1–6 record, and marking the first time they failed to qualify for the playoffs since becoming an OWL affiliate team. In 2019 Season 2, Uprising Academy finished the regular season with a 5–2 record to qualify for the NA East regional playoffs. However, the team fell to the Gladiators Legion in the NA East quarterfinals match.

In 2021, Uprising Academy announced it would be playing in OWC Korea for 2021 season 1.

In May 2021, Uprising Academy announced its return to North America for Contenders Trials Season 2.

In October 2022, Uprising Academy announced that it would no longer be competing in Overwatch Contenders 2022.

Seasons overview

Current roster

OWL buyouts and promotions 
All Overwatch Contenders players are eligible to be promoted by their affiliated Overwatch League team or signed to any other Overwatch League during specified non-blackout periods.

2018 
Support Harrison "Kruise" Pond was signed by new expansion franchise Paris Eternal on October 23.
Tank Park "Axxiom" Min-seob and DPS Kelsey "Colourhex" Birse were promoted to Boston Uprising on October 30.
DPS Charlie "nero" Zwarg and support Kim "Shu" Jin-seo were signed to Guangzhou Charge on November 22.

2019 
Tank Cameron "Fusions" Bosworth was promoted to Boston Uprising on February 12.
Support Gabriel "Swimmer" Levy and tank Walid "Mouffin" Bassal were promoted to Boston Uprising on November 7, with Mouffin on a two-way contract.
DPS Chris "MirroR" Trinh was signed to the Los Angeles Gladiators on November 12.

2021 
Tank Yun "GaeBullSsi" Young-sun was promoted to Boston Uprising on April 16.
DPS Lim "Finale" Jung-woo was signed to the Toronto Defiant on December 12.
DPS Oh "Victoria" Gi-hun was promoted to Boston Uprising on December 22.

2022 
Tank Kim "ITSAL" Chang-hee was promoted to Boston Uprising on March 23.

OWL affiliates
Uprising Academy
 Boston Uprising (2018–present)

Toronto Esports
 Boston Uprising (2018)

References 

Overwatch League academy teams
Esports teams based in the United States
Sports teams in Boston
Esports teams established in 2016
Boston Uprising